Pendleton Woolen Mills is an American textile manufacturing company based in Portland, Oregon, United States. It is known for its blankets and woolen clothing.

Company origins

The company's roots began in 1863 when Thomas Lister Kay made a transcontinental trek to the west coast and began working in Oregon's woolen mills. He went on to open his own woolen mill, the Thomas Kay Woolen Mill in Salem, Oregon. Kay was an immigrant from England and a weaver by trade. He had worked in various textile mills on the east coast of the United States. Before opening his own mill in Salem, he helped to set up only the second mill in Oregon at Brownsville.

Kay brought his oldest daughter, Martha Ann "Fannie" Kay, into the business and after learning the operation and management of the mill, she became her father's assistant. In 1876 Fannie married retail merchant C.P. (Charles Pleasant) Bishop. This proved to be a great benefit to Kay's company and to the Bishop enterprises in the combination of manufacturing and retail sales. The Bishops passed their expertise and knowledge to their three sons: Clarence, Roy, and (Robert) Chauncey.

In 1909 the family reopened  the defunct Pendleton Woolen Mills. The town of Pendleton, Oregon backed the family in their new business venture and the Bishops’ company also took over the name Pendleton Woolen Mills. The move to eastern Oregon made sense for the business because eastern Oregon was sheep country and having wool producers near the mills allowed the mills to significantly cut production costs. The town of Pendleton is a major railhead for the Columbia River Plateau and allowed convenient shipping for the growing business. Pendleton photographer Walter S. Bowman captured early 20th century images of the mill's interior, exterior and its workers.

The mill owned by the Bishops had been built in 1893 and had been a wool scouring plant, where raw wool was scrubbed and packed before shipping out to the textile mills. In 1895 it was enlarged and converted into a textile mill that, by the following year, had begun making Native American trade blankets—geometric patterned robes (unfringed blankets) for Native American men and shawls (fringed blankets) for Native American women in the area—the Umatilla, Cayuse, Nez Perce and Walla Walla tribes. That business eventually failed and the plant stood idle until the Bishop family, spurred by Fannie Kay Bishop, purchased it. When the Bishop assumed ownership, they built a new mill with the help of the town of Pendleton, which issued bonds for the mill's construction.

Blankets

The family resumed the production of Jacquard blankets and introduced new designs, colors, and patterns to their product line. They also changed the construction of the mill's blankets. Prior to 1909 the blankets had round corners. The Bishop blankets featured square corners. Pendleton round corner blankets are highly coveted by vintage Pendleton blanket collectors.

The company expanded their trade from the local indigenous  tribes of the Columbia River area to the Navajo, Hopi, and Zuni peoples of the American Southwest. To do this, they enlisted the help of designer Joe Rawnsley, who visited tribes to learn their customs and color preferences. Like many other mills of the day, Pendleton also emulated the multicolor patterns of candy-stripe blankets, like those found on Hudson's Bay point blankets for their Glacier National Park blanket. The Pendleton blankets became not only basic wearing apparel, but also were standards of trading and ceremonial use.

Expansion

The company began to expand their product line into other woolen textile products and later into apparel. In 1912 the company opened a weaving mill in Washougal, Washington (across the Columbia River from Portland) for the production of woolen fabrics used in suits and other clothing.

One of the original three Bishop sons, Clarence Morton Bishop—usually known as “C.M.”—started a new product line of men's woolen sport shirts in bright colors and patterns. Prior to that time woolen shirts had been considered work shirts and came in mostly dull colors. In 1924 the company began producing men's woolen sport shirts and by 1929 the company was producing a full line of woolen sportswear.

The second Bishop son, Roy, had left the company in 1918 to form his own company, the Oregon Worsted Company. The third son, Chauncey, died in 1927. This left C.M. with the sole responsibility for management of both woolen mills.

During World War II, 1941–45, Pendleton Woolen Mills devoted most of its production to blankets and fabric for uniforms and clothing for the US military services.

In 1949, after postwar market research showed a desire for women's sportswear, the company introduced a line of wool clothing for women and the '49er jacket proved extremely popular. The reversible pleated "Turnabout Skirt" was also very popular, literally two-skirts-in-one.

In 1960, a little-known singing group known as the Pendletones was formed, taking their name from the classic Pendleton wool plaid shirt. This group later changed their name to The Beach Boys and the Pendleton shirt became popular among American youth.

In 1972 the company again expanded its product line with the introduction of non-wool garments for men and women. Many customers had a desire for the classic Pendleton style for 'year round wear, but wanted lighter clothing for spring and summer wear. Again the new line was a major success.

Retail distribution

Throughout the company's history its products had been sold in specialty stores and selected department stores, including, C.P. Bishop's original clothing store in Salem. In the 1980s Pendleton entered the retail business with a chain of company-owned and affiliated stores that sold the full line of Pendleton products. The company also began a direct to consumer catalog business and expanded into an ecommerce platform in the 1990s.

The company today

As of 2019, the company is privately held and under the management by the 5th generation heirs of Thomas Kay. John Bishop, great-great-grandson of Thomas Kay, is president and CEO. Great-great-grandson Peter Bishop is the Executive VP of Merchandising and Design. The company operates seven facilities and 41 retail stores. Pendleton products are sold in the United States, Canada, Australia, Europe, Japan, and Korea.

The company headquarters are in Portland, Oregon. The original mills in Pendleton, Oregon, and Washougal, Washington, are among the few woolen mills in operation in the United States today, and Pendleton woolen fabrics and blankets are still woven in these Pacific Northwest mills.

Mission Mill Museum
The original Thomas Kay Woolen Mill in Salem was operated by the Kay family, until it was closed in 1962. The mill was later purchased by the Mission Mill Museum Association, a private, non-profit organization formed in 1964. Mission Mill Museum is the only woolen mill museum west of Missouri and has one of the few water-powered turbines in the Pacific Northwest that still generates electricity from a millrace. The mill is now run as the Willamette Heritage Center.

See also
 Cowichan knitting – Indigenous garment style adapted by Pendleton

References

Pendleton Woolen Mills: Company History

External links
Official Pendleton Woolen Mills website
Official Pendleton Canada website
Hoovers.com: Report on Pendleton Woolen Mills, Inc.
History of the Thomas Kay Woolen Mill in Salem, Oregon
Salem Public Library Association: Biography of Thomas L. Kay 
Google Books: 1910 photo of Pendleton Woolen Mills workers — by Walter S. Bowman.
Historic photo archive.com: 1934 photo of the Pendleton Woolen Mill
Umatilla County scenic images includes photo of present day Pendleton Woolen Mill 
Tamastslikt.com: Designs of Pendleton Native American traditional-style blankets
Indiantraders.com: Pendleton Native American traditional-style blankets  
Collectorsguide.com: Story on American Indian trade blankets
Maybornmuseum.com: "Wrapped In Tradition: The Chihuly Collection of American Indian Trade Blankets" — show at Mayborn Museum Complex in Waco, Texas.

Textile mills in the United States
Woollen mills
Blankets
Clothing brands
Clothing manufacturers
Clothing companies of the United States
Companies based in Portland, Oregon
Pendleton, Oregon
Manufacturing companies based in Oregon
American companies established in 1909
Clothing companies established in 1909
Manufacturing companies established in 1909
1909 establishments in Oregon
Privately held companies based in Oregon
Washougal, Washington
Wool clothing